In mathematics, a cyclic graph may mean a graph that contains a cycle, or a graph that is a cycle, with varying definitions of cycles. See:
Cycle (graph theory), a cycle in a graph
Forest (graph theory), an undirected graph with no cycles
Biconnected graph, an undirected graph in which every edge belongs to a cycle
Directed acyclic graph, a directed graph with no cycles
Strongly connected graph, a directed graph in which every edge belongs to a cycle
Aperiodic graph, a directed graph in which the cycle lengths have no nontrivial common divisor
Pseudoforest, a directed or undirected graph in which every connected component includes at most one cycle
Cycle graph, a graph that has the structure of a single cycle
Pancyclic graph, a graph that has cycles of all possible lengths
Cycle detection (graph theory), the algorithmic problem of finding cycles in graphs

Other similarly-named concepts include
Cycle graph (algebra), a graph that illustrates the cyclic subgroups of a group
Circulant graph, a graph with an automorphism which permutes its vertices cyclically.